Ceylonese / Sri Lankans in Singapore consist mainly of Singaporeans of Sri Lankan origin whose ancestors came to Singapore before the independence of the island. With respect to ethnic group data in Singapore, Ceylonese / Sri Lankans were classified under Others up to 1970, whereupon they are classified as Indians.

Colonial period

The Jaffna Tamils are predominantly large in number among the people who went to Singapore and Malaya in the 19th and early 20th centuries. Ever since their arrival in Singapore, they were identifying themselves "Ceylonese". They dominated the bureaucracy in Singapore as the British preferred employing the Ceylonese as bureaucrats in many of their Asian colonies. Ceylonese Tamils made up an overwhelming majority in the civil service of British Malaya and Singapore prior to independence.

In 1909, the Ceylon Tamils, who had grown in number to about 300 families, formed the Singapore Ceylon Tamils’ Association (SCTA).  Sri Lankans in Singapore and Malaysia formed the 'Lanka Regiment' of the Indian National Army, directly under Netaji Subhas Chandra Bose.

Former Singaporean Prime Minister Lee Kuan Yew once said:

Some Ceylonese-founded institutions from the colonial era still exist. The Sri Senpaga Vinayagar Temple was founded by Ceylonese Tamils on the appropriately named Ceylon Road. Ceylon Sports Club was established in 1928 at its current premises along Balester Road and continues to function as not only a sports club but a social and charitable institution.

Post-Independence

In recent years, many Sri Lankans have been coming to Singapore. Sri Lankan domestic workers form a large number of the 150,000 maids in Singapore.  Many students from Sri Lanka have also been coming to Singapore for further education. On July 31, 2010, the Singapore Ceylon Tamils' Association marked its 100th anniversary.

Notable Singaporeans of Sri Lankan descent
Politics
 S. Rajaratnam - Deputy Prime Minister of Singapore from 1980–85. Regarded as one of the founding fathers of independent Singapore
 Tharman Shanmugaratnam - Current Deputy Prime Minister of Singapore
 Joshua Benjamin Jeyaretnam - Leader of the Workers' Party of Singapore from 1971 to 2001
 Kenneth Jeyaretnam - Current Secretary-General (leader) of the Reform Party in Singapore
 Vincent Wijeysingha - Current Assistant Treasurer of the Singapore Democratic Party
Law
 K. S. Rajah - Senior Counsel and former Judicial Commissioner of the Supreme Court of Singapore
 Philip Jeyaretnam - Lawyer
 Eugene Thuraisingam - Human rights lawyer
Education
 Lloyd Fernando - Malaysian author and professor at the University of Malaya in the English Department
 Rohan Gunaratna - International terrorism expert
 Shan Ratnam - Professor and head of the department of Obstetrics and Gynaecology of the National University Hospital of Singapore
Arts
 Jacintha Abisheganaden - Singer and actress; father is Sri Lankan Tamil
 Natalie Hennedige - theatre director and dramatist; father is Sinhalese
 Neila Sathyalingam - Singaporean classical Indian dancer
 Sharmila Melissa Yogalingam - Singaporean award nominated writer
 Roshni Karwal - television presenter; journalist

See also
 Sri Lankan Tamil diaspora
 Indian Singaporeans

References

External links

Ethnic groups in Singapore
 
Singapore
Immigration to Singapore